The Latvian Hawks are an ice hockey team based in Dundalk, Ireland.  They play all of their games in the Dundalk Ice Dome in Dundalk, Ireland and play in the Irish Ice Hockey League.  The team's name is an homage to the large contingent of Latvian expatriates who settled in Ireland.

They became the Charlestown Chiefs for the 2009-10 season.

Roster

Awards and Championships
2007 St. Patrick's Cup Champions

References

External links
Official website

2007 establishments in Ireland
Ice hockey clubs established in 2007
Ice hockey teams in County Dublin
Ice hockey teams in Ireland